WLYU (100.9 FM) is a radio station broadcasting a country music format, licensed in Lyons, Georgia, United States.  The station is currently owned by T.C.B. Broadcasting, Inc., and features programming from ABC Radio.

Y-101 is also heavily involved in the community and broadcasts from Red Cross Bloodmobile drives in Lyons and Vidalia.  The station also does live coverage of the Southeast Georgia Soap Box Derby. The station carries Georgia Southern Football. The station also covers Toombs County Sports. WLYU also carries Fox News.

References

External links

LYU
Radio stations established in 1991